Coverture (sometimes spelled couverture) was a legal doctrine in the English common law in which a married woman's legal existence was considered to be merged with that of her husband, so that she had no independent legal existence of her own.

Coverture was well established in the common law for several centuries and was inherited by many other common law jurisdictions, including the United States. According to historian Arianne Chernock, coverture did not apply in Scotland, but whether it applied in Wales is unclear.

After the rise of the women's rights movement in the mid-19th century, coverture was increasingly criticised as oppressive, hindering women from exercising ordinary property rights and entering professions. Coverture was first substantially modified by late-19th-century Married Women's Property Acts passed in various common-law jurisdictions, and was weakened and eventually eliminated by later reforms. Certain aspects of coverture (mainly concerned with preventing a wife from unilaterally incurring major financial obligations for which her husband would be liable) survived as late as the 1960s in some states of the United States.

Principle 
Under traditional English common law, an adult unmarried woman was considered to have the legal status of feme sole, while a married woman had the status of feme covert. These terms are English spellings of medieval Anglo-Norman phrases (the modern standard French spellings would be femme seule "single woman" and femme couverte, literally "covered woman").

The principle of coverture was described in William Blackstone's Commentaries on the Laws of England in the late 18th century:

A feme sole had the right to own property and make contracts in her own name, while a feme covert was not recognized as having legal rights and obligations distinct from those of her husband in most respects. Instead, through marriage a woman's existence was incorporated into that of her husband, so that she had very few recognized individual rights of her own. As expressed in Hugo Black's dissent in United States v. Yazell, "This rule [coverture] has worked out in reality to mean that though the husband and wife are one, the one is the husband." A married woman could not own property, sign legal documents or enter into a contract, obtain an education against her husband's wishes, or keep a salary for herself. If a wife was permitted to work, under the laws of coverture, she was required to relinquish her wages to her husband. On the other hand, a feme couvert could not be sued or sue in her own name.  In certain cases, a wife did not have individual legal liability for her misdeeds since it was legally assumed that she was acting under the orders of her husband, and generally a husband and a wife were not allowed to testify either for or against each other.

A queen of England, whether she was a queen consort or a queen regnant, was generally exempted from the legal requirements of coverture, as understood by Blackstone.

History 

The system of feme sole and feme covert developed in England in the High and Late Middle Ages as part of the common law system imposed following the Norman Conquest in 1066, as its French linguisitic origin indicates.  The legal reforms of Henry II and other medieval English kings did constitutionalize rights of women, including through the Treatise of Glanvill. Medieval legal treatises of Catholic adherent monarchs, such as that known as Bracton, described the nature of coverture and its impact on married women's legal actions. Bracton states that husband and wife were a single person, being one flesh and one blood, a principle known as 'unity of person'. Husbands also wielded power over their wives, being their rulers and custodians of their property.

While it was once assumed that married women had little or no access to legal recourse, as a result of coverture, historians have more recently complicated our knowledge of coverture in the Middle Ages through various studies of married women's legal status across different courts and jurisdictions. Collectively, many of these studies have argued that 'there has been a tendency to overplay the extent to which coverture applied', as legal records reveal that married women could possess rights over property, could take part in business transactions, and interact with the courts. In medieval post-conquest Wales, it has been suggested that coverture only applied in certain situations. Married women were responsible for their own actions in criminal presentments and defamation, but their husbands represented them in litigation for abduction and in interpersonal pleas.

The extent of coverture in medieval England has also been qualified by the existence of femme sole customs that existed in some medieval English towns. This granted them independent commercial and legal rights as if they were single. This practice is outlined in the custumal of Henry Darcy, Lord Mayor of London in the 1330s, allowing married women working independently of their husband to act as a single woman in all matters concerning her craft, such as renting a shop and suing and being sued for debt. The custom is known to have been adopted in a number of other towns, including Bristol, Lincoln, York, Sandwich, Rye, Carlisle, Chester and Exeter. Some North American British colonies also adopted this custom in the eighteenth century. However, it is unclear how many women took up this status, the extent to which it was legally enforced, or whether the legal and commercial independence it offered were advantageous.

According to Chernock, "coverture, ... [a 1777] author ... concluded, was the product of foreign Norman invasion in the eleventh century—not, as Blackstone would have it, a time-tested 'English' legal practice. This was a reading of British history, then, that put a decidedly feminist twist on the idea of the 'Norman yoke. Also according to Chernock, "the Saxons, ... [Calidore] boasted, had encouraged women to 'retain separate property'— ... a clear blow to coverture." Chernock claims that "as the historical accounts of the laws regarding women had indicated, coverture was a policy not just foreign in its origins but also suited to particular and now remote historical conditions." Coverture may not have existed in "the Anglo-Saxon constitution".

Coverture also held sway in English-speaking colonies because of the influence of the English common law there. The way in which coverture operated across the common law world has been the subject of recent studies examining the subordinating effects of marriage for women across medieval and early modern England and North America, in a variety of legal contexts. It has been argued that in practice, most of the rules of coverture "served not to guide every transaction but rather to provide clarity and direction in times of crisis or death." Despite this flexibility, coverture remained a powerful tool of marital inequality for many centuries.

Criticism

Early feminist historian Mary Ritter Beard held the view that much of the severity of the doctrine of coverture was actually due to Blackstone and other late systematizers rather than due to a genuine old common-law tradition.

In March 1776, Abigail Adams saw an opportunity in the language of natural rights, and wrote to her husband, John Adams:

She was not writing generally about women's rights, or specifically about the right to vote. She was asking for relief from coverture. John responded, "I cannot but laugh."

According to Chernock, "late Enlightenment radicals .... argued ... [that "coverture" and other "principles"] did not reflect the 'advancements' of a modern, civilized society. Rather, they were markers of past human errors and inconsistencies, and thus in need of further revision." Chernock claimed that "as the editor of Blackstone's Commentaries, [Edward] Christian used his popular thirteenth edition, published in 1800, to highlight the ways in which the practice of coverture might be modified." Chernock wrote that "Christian .... proceeded to recommend that a husband cease to be 'absolutely master of the profits of the wife's lands during the coverture. Chernock reported that other men sought for coverture to be modified or eliminated.

According to Ellen Carol DuBois, "the initial target of women's rights protest was the legal doctrine of 'coverture... The earliest American women's right lecturer, John Neal attacked coverture in speeches and public debates as early as 1823, but most prominently in the 1840s, asking "how long [women] shall be rendered by law incapable of acquiring, holding, or transmitting property, except under special conditions, like the slave?" In the 1850s, according to DuBois, Lucy Stone criticized "the common law of marriage because it 'gives the "custody" of the wife's person to her husband, so that he has a right to her even against herself. Stone kept her premarital family name after marriage as a protest "against all manifestations of coverture". DuBois continued, "in the 1850s, ....  primarily legal goal [of "the American women's rights movement"] was the establishment of basic property rights for women once they were married, which went to the core of the deprivations of coverture." Chernock continued, "for those who determined that legal reforms were the key to achieving a more enlightened relationship between the sexes, coverture was a primary object of attention."

DuBois wrote that coverture, because of property restrictions with the vote, "played a major role in" influencing the effort to secure women's right to vote in the U.S., because one view was that the right should be limited to women who owned property when coverture excluded most women (relatively few were unmarried or widowed), while another view was for the right to be available for all women.

In the mid-19th century, according to Melissa J. Homestead, coverture was criticized as depriving married women authors of the financial benefits of their copyrights, including analogizing to slavery; one woman poet "explicitly analogized her legal status as a married woman author to that of an American slave." According to Homestead, feminists also criticized the effect of coverture on rights under patents held by married women.

Hendrik Hartog counter-criticized that coverture was only a legal fiction and not descriptive of social reality and that courts applying equity jurisdiction had developed many exceptions to coverture, but, according to Norma Basch, the exceptions themselves still required that the woman be dependent on someone and not all agreements between spouses to let wives control their property were enforceable in court.

In 1869, coverture was criticized when Myra Bradwell was refused permission to practice as a lawyer in Illinois specifically because of coverture. In 1871, Bradwell argued to the Supreme Court that coverture violated the Constitution's 14th Amendment. According to Margot Canaday, "coverture's main purpose ... was the legal subordination of women." Canaday continued, "women's legal subordination through marriage ... was maintained in fact across [coverture]".

According to Canaday, "coverture was diminished ... in the 1970s, as part of a broader feminist revolution in law that further weakened the principle that a husband owned a wife's labor (including her person).... The regime of coverture ... was coming undone [in the mid-20th century]". In 1966, the U.S. Supreme Court said "the institution of coverture is ... obsolete" even while acknowledging coverture's existence in 1–11 states. In a separate opinion in the same case, Hugo Black and two others of the nine justices said the "fiction that the husband and wife are one... in reality ...  that though the husband and wife are one, the one is the husband....[,] rested on ... a ... notion that a married woman, being a female, is without capacity to make her own contracts and do her own business", a notion that Black "had supposed is ... completely discredited". Black described modern (as of 1966) coverture as an "archaic remnant of a primitive caste system". Canaday wrote, "the application of equal protection law to marital relations finally eviscerated the law of coverture" and "coverture unraveled with accelerating speed [in the late 20th century]". "Coverture's demise blunted (even if it did not eliminate) male privilege within marriage", according to Canaday.

Abolition 
This situation continued until the mid-to-late 19th century, when married women's property acts started to be passed in many English-speaking jurisdictions, setting the stage for further reforms.

In the United States, many states passed Married Women's Property Acts to eliminate or reduce the effects of coverture. Nineteenth-century courts in the United States also enforced state privy examination laws. A privy examination was an American legal practice in which a married woman who wished to sell her property had to be separately examined by a judge or justice of the peace outside of the presence of her husband and asked if her husband was pressuring her into signing the document. This practice was seen as a means to protect married women's property from overbearing husbands. Other states abolished the concept through court cases, for example: California in Follansbee v. Benzenberg (1954). The abolition of coverture has been seen as "one of the greatest extensions of property rights in human history", and one that led to a number of positive financial and economic impacts. Specifically, it led to shifts in household portfolios, a positive shock to the supply of credit, and a reallocation of labor towards non-agriculture and capital intensive industries.

As recently as 1972, two US states allowed a wife accused in criminal court to offer as a legal defense that she was obeying her husband's orders.

Analogous concepts outside the common law system 
In the Roman-Dutch law, the marital power was a doctrine very similar to the doctrine of coverture in the English common law. Under the marital power doctrine, a wife was legally a minor under the guardianship of her husband.

Under the Napoleonic Code – which was very influential both inside and outside of Europe – married women and children were subordinated to the husband's/father's authority. Married French women obtained the right to work without their husband's consent in 1965. In France, the paternal authority of a man over his family was ended in 1970 (before that parental responsibilities belonged solely to the father who made all legal decisions concerning the children); and a new reform in 1985 abolished the stipulation that the father had the sole power to administer the children's property. Neighboring Switzerland was one  of the last European countries to establish gender equality in marriage: married women's rights were severely restricted until 1988, when legal reforms providing gender equality in marriage, abolishing the legal authority of the husband, came into force (these reforms had been approved in 1985 by voters in a referendum, who narrowly voted in favor with 54.7% of voters approving).

In 1979, Louisiana became the last of the states of the U.S. to have its Head and Master law struck down. An appeal made it to the Supreme Court of the United States in 1980, and in the following year the high court's decision in Kirchberg v. Feenstra effectively declared the practice of male-rule in marriage unconstitutional, generally favoring instead a co-administration model.

Outside the legal realm 
The doctrine of coverture carried over into British heraldry, in which there were established traditional methods of displaying the coat of arms of an unmarried woman, displaying the coat of arms of a widow, or displaying the combined coat of arms of a couple jointly, but no accepted method of displaying the coat of arms of a married woman separately as an individual.

The practice by which a woman relinquishes her name and adopts her husband's name (e.g., "Mrs. John Smith") is similarly a representation of coverture, although usually symbolic rather than legal in form.

In some cultures, particularly in the Anglophone West, wives often change their surnames to that of their husbands upon getting married. Although this procedure is today optional, for some it remains a controversial practice due to its tie to the historical doctrine of coverture or to other similar doctrines in civil law systems, and to the historically subordinated roles of wives; while others argue that today this is merely a harmless tradition that should be accepted as a free choice. Some jurisdictions consider this practice as discriminatory and contrary to women's rights, and have restricted or banned it; for example, since 1983, when Greece adopted a new marriage law which guaranteed gender equality between the spouses, women in Greece are required to keep their birth names for their whole life.

Cultural references 
The phrase "the law is an ass" was popularized by Charles Dickens' Oliver Twist, when the character Mr. Bumble is informed that "the law supposes that your wife acts under your direction". Mr. Bumble replies, "if the law supposes that ... the law is a  ass – a idiot. If that's the eye of the law, the law is a bachelor; and the worst I wish the law is that his eye may be opened by experience – by experience."

The German television show Black Forest House follows three families who are trying to survive six months in the Montana countryside, including growing their own crops and surviving the winter. It takes place during presidency of Abraham Lincoln, who was president when the Homestead Act of 1862 became law. During the show it is noted that coverture was still in effect, so only single women could claim land under the Homestead Act, because married women lost most of their rights.

See also 
 Baron and feme
 Curtesy
 Dower
 Marriage bar
 Jure uxoris ‒ phrase related to a man holding titles of his wife via coverture

Explanatory notes

References

Citations

General bibliography

External links
 

Copyright law
Family law legal terminology
Feminism and history
Legal fictions
Legal history by issue
Legal history of England
Legal history of the United States
Marriage law
Patent law
Sexism